The 2022–23 Duke Blue Devils women's basketball team will represent Duke University during the 2022–23 NCAA Division I women's basketball season. The Blue Devils will be led by third year head coach Kara Lawson and play their home games at Cameron Indoor Stadium in Durham, North Carolina as members of the Atlantic Coast Conference.

Previous season

The Blue Devils finished the season 17–13 overall and 7–11 in ACC play to finish in tenth place.  As the tenth seed in the ACC tournament, they defeated Pittsburgh in the First Round before losing to seventh seed Miami in the Second Round.  They were not invited to the NCAA tournament or the WNIT despite being ranked as high as No. 15 during the regular season.

Off-season

Departures

Incoming transfers

Recruiting Class

Source:

Roster

Schedule

Source

|-
!colspan=9 style=| Exhibition

|-
!colspan=9 style=| Non-Conference Regular season

|-
!colspan=9 style=| ACC Regular season

|-
!colspan=9 style=| ACC Women's Tournament

|-
!colspan=9 style=| NCAA Women's Tournament

Rankings
2022–23 NCAA Division I women's basketball rankings

Coaches did not release a Week 2 poll and AP does not release a final poll.

See also
 2022–23 Duke Blue Devils men's basketball team

References

Duke Blue Devils women's basketball seasons
Duke
Duke women's basketball
Duke women's basketball
Duke